The FAI Cup Final, known recently as the FAI Ford Cup Final for sponsorship reasons, is an annual soccer match which is the last game in the Football Association of Ireland Challenge Cup. It is the culmination of a knock-out competition among clubs belonging to the Football Association of Ireland, generally competed for by clubs from the Republic of Ireland, although representatives from Northern Ireland (most notably Derry City) have competed and even won the Cup. Shelbourne, Bohemians and Derry City are the only clubs to win both the (Northern) Irish Cup and the FAI Cup, although Shelbourne and Bohemians only won it before partition, whilst Derry City remained in the Northern Irish league system until 1973, entering the League of Ireland in 1985.

The FAI Cup final was played at Dalymount Park until 1990, since when it has been played at several venues. The 2006 final was the last soccer game to be played at the old Lansdowne Road before it was redeveloped and rebranded the Aviva Stadium. It was contested between St Patrick's Athletic and Derry City, who ran out eventual 4-3 winners after extra-time. The original FAI Cup was also retired after this game with a brand new version of the trophy used in the following seasons. The cup final has been held at the Aviva Stadium since 2010.

List of results

Performance by club

Notes:
 1 Since 1985 when Derry City joined to the league.
 2 Includes Waterford.
 3 Includes Limerick United.
 4 Includes Drogheda.

List of Match Officials

See also 
 FAI Cup

References

External links 
"'You can't lose, you'll make the league look bad'", RTÉ Sport, 13 May 2020.